Larike is a village in district Leihitu Barat. Regncy Maluki, Maluku province, Indonedia. Linked postal code is 97581.

Reference

Larike
Larike